Melissa Lucashenko is an Indigenous Australian writer of adult literary fiction and literary non-fiction, who has also written novels for teenagers.

In 2013 at The Walkley Awards, she won the "Feature Writing Long (over 4000 words) Award" for her piece Sinking below sight: Down and out in Brisbane and Logan. In 2019, she won the Miles Franklin award for Too Much Lip.

Early life and education
Melissa Lucashenko was born in 1967 in Brisbane, Australia. Her heritage is Bundjalung and European. She is a graduate of Griffith University (1990), with an honours degree in public policy.

In 1992 she was a founding member of Sisters Inside, an organisation which supports women and girls in prison.

Writing career
She has said that when she began writing seriously "there was still a glaring hole in Australian literature", with almost no prominent Aboriginal voices and with only the University of Queensland Press and a few other small outlets publishing the work of Aboriginal writers. When asked whether she considers herself primarily a writer, or an Aboriginal writer, she writes that the question runs into semantic difficulties, because the word means different things to different people.

Lucashenko's first work to be published was the novel Steam Pigs (1997), which won the Dobbie Literary Award for Australian women's fiction. It was also a short-list nominee for the NSW Premier's Award and the regional Commonwealth Writers' Prize. 
 
In 1998 she released the novel Killing Darcy, which won the Aurora Prize of the Royal Blind Society, was a finalist for the 1998 Aurealis Award for best young-adult novel and named on the 1998 James Tiptree Jr Memorial Award long list.

In 1999 her third novel, Hard Yards was published and was a finalist in both the 1999 NSW Premier's Literary Awards and the 2001 Courier-Mail Book of the Year. In 2002 her fourth novel Too Flash, written for young adults, was published.

Lucashenko's fifth novel, Mullumbimby, won the prestigious Deloitte Fiction Book Award in 2013 and the Victorian Premier's Literary Award for Indigenous Writing in 2014, as well as being nominated for several other awards. In 2015 it was longlisted for the International Dublin Literary Award.

She is also an accomplished essayist, winning the 2013  "Feature Writing Long (over 4000 words)" Walkley Award for Sinking below sight: Down and out in Brisbane and Logan. Speaking about this essay, Lucashenko said that she was partly informed by her studies in public policy: "...one thing I was trying to bring out in the piece was the odd mix of structural factors and just sheer luck, good and bad, that makes up people's lives. All of these women are poor because of the violence and because of intergenerational poverty, and those things can be attacked in policy and should be attacked in policy.".

In September 2015, in a collaboration with Poets House in New York, a recording of six First Nations Australia Writers Network members reading their work was presented at a special event, which was recorded.  The readers were Lucashenko, Jeanine Leane, Dub Leffler, Bruce Pascoe, Jared Thomas and Ellen van Neerven.

Lucashenko was awarded the Copyright Agency Author Fellowship in 2016 to focus on her new novel, which was published as Too Much Lip in 2018. In early 2019, the novel was shortlisted for the Stella Prize. Judges called it "...a fearless, searing and unvarnished portrait of generational trauma cut through with acerbic humour." The novel went on to win the 2019 Miles Franklin Award. In May 2019, Cenozoic Pictures optioned Too Much Lip for a screen adaptation, with Lucashenko as a co-writer and co-creator alongside Cenozoic's Veronica Gleeson.

Personal life and family
In March 2014 The Moth Radio Hour aired a recording of Lucashenko recounting the story of moving with her husband and daughter back to the Aboriginal lands in New South Wales (where her great-grandmother grew up), and subsequent divorce from her husband and mental illness of her daughter.

Bibliography

Novels
Steam Pigs, University of Queensland Press (1997) 
Killing Darcy, University of Queensland Press (1998)    (YA novel)
Hard Yards, University of Queensland Press (1999) 
Too Flash, IAD Press (2002)    (YA novel)
Uptown Girl, University of Queensland Press (2002) 
Mullumbimby, University of Queensland Press (2013) 
Too Much Lip, University of Queensland Press (2018)

Essays
"Whiteness" or "I'm not racist, but.." (undated)
"Who let the dogs out?" (undated)
"Not quite white in the head" in Griffith Review edition 2 (2004)
"Our bodies" in Making Perfect Bodies, Griffith Review, edition 4 (2005)
"Globalisation, Kimberley style" in Griffith Review, edition 6 (2005)
"How green is my valley?" in Griffith Review, edition 12 (2007)
"On the same page, right?" in Griffith Review, edition 26 (2009)
"The silent majority" in Stories for Today, edition 26 (2009)
"Sinking below sight" in Griffith Review, edition 41 (2013) (Winner of a 2013 Walkley Award and 2014 George Munster Award for Independent Journalism)
 "History's footnote, or, a Wolvi incident", pp. 63–69, in: Destroying the Joint: Why women have to change the world, edited by Jane Caro, (UQP, 2013)

List of all essays in Griffith Review

Nominations and awards

=== Aurealis Award for best young adult novel ===

1998: Nomination: Killing Darcy

Aurora Prize of the Royal Blind Society 

1998: Winner: Killing Darcy

Australian Book Industry Awards 

2019: Longlist: Too Much Lip

Commonwealth Writers' Prize 

1997: Nomination: Steam Pigs

Courier-Mail Book of the Year 

2001: Nomination: Hard Yards

Dobbie Literary Award 

1998: Winner: Steam Pigs

International Dublin Literary Award 

2015: Longlist: Mullumbimby
2020: Longlist: Too Much Lip

James Tiptree Jr Award 

1998: Longlist: Killing Darcy

Miles Franklin Award 

2014: Longlist: Mullumbimby
2019: Winner: Too Much Lip

Nita B Kibble Literary Award 

2014: Shortlist: Mullumbimby

New South Wales Premier's Literary Awards 

1997: Shortlist Steam Pigs
1999: Shortlist: Hard Yards
2019: Shortlist: Too Much Lip

Queensland Literary Awards: Deloitte Fiction Book Award 

2013: Winner: Mullumbimby

Queensland Literary Awards: Queensland Premier's Award for a work of State Significance 

 2019: Winner: Too Much Lip

Queensland Literary Awards: The University of Queensland Fiction Book Award 

 2019: Shortlist: Too Much Lip

Stella Prize 

2014: Longlist: Mullumbimby
2019: Shortlist: Too Much Lip

Victorian Premier's Literary Award for Indigenous Writing 

2014: Winner: Mullumbimby
2019: Shortlist: Too Much Lip

Walkley Award: Feature Writing Long (over 4000 words) 

 2013: Winner: "Sinking below sight" in Griffith Review, edition 41

References

Further reading
 Nathanael O'Reilly 'Exploring Indigenous Identity in Suburbia: Melissa Lucashenko's Steam Pigs ' JASAL 10 (2010)

External links

Official site

1967 births
Living people
20th-century Australian novelists
21st-century Australian novelists
Australian essayists
Australian women novelists
20th-century Australian women writers
21st-century Australian women writers
20th-century essayists
21st-century essayists
Indigenous Australian writers
Miles Franklin Award winners
Writers from Brisbane
Bundjalung people
Australian people of Ukrainian descent